Gianluca Testa (born March 2, 1982) is an Italian actor, director and singer-songwriter.

Biography 
Gianluca Testa began his acting career in theatre productions and independent cinema. In theatre he worked with Giuliano Vasilicò and Gruppo di Ricerca e Progettazione Teatrale, starring the role of San Giovanni in Dal Vangelo secondo Giovanni for three years and worked with Giancarlo Nanni and Teatro Vascello in Rome since 2006 to 2009. In 2006 he appeared in the official music video for Raf (singer) in the song Dimentica. In 2008, he starred as Mirko Bertolini in the miniseries  Rex on Rai 1 and as Francesco Ticconi in the television series Carabinieri on Canale 5. In 2009 he starred as main character in the movie  Mad in italy, distributed in the US, and in Symphony in Blood Red, distributed in Germany. In 2010 he starred as Brenno in the movie Pipi Room, directed by Jerry Calà, and in Calibro 10, with Franco Nero. In the same year he starred the role of Syd Barrett in the musical Syd l'altra faccia della luna and directed the short film Fagiolino e il cavaliere under the patronage of Molise.  In 2014, Gianluca Testa wrote and directed the short film Banza Kiri! starred by Aurora Ruffino.  In 2019, Gianluca Testa wrote and directed the short film La strategia del prigioniero starred by Daniele Marcheggiani, Anca Mariana Doncilà, Roberta Valdes. Since 2002 he directs many commercials and music videos for Video Italia and MTV. He works also as trainer in the field of self-help and acting coach. In 2020 Testa released his studio album Nomade digitale

Selected filmography

Films 
Pipi Room, directed by Jerry Calà (2011)
Calibro 10 (2010)
Mad in Italy(2009)
Symphony in Blood Red(2009)

Television 
Rex (2008, miniseries)
Carabinieri (2008, television series)

Music Videos
Dimentica by Raf (singer) (2006)

Short films 
Banza Kiri!, screenwriter and director (2014)
Fagiolino e il cavaliere, screenwriter and director (2010)
La strategia del prigioniero, screenwriter and director (2019)

Selected discography
 2002 – L'inesprimibile sogno di Giada
 2006 – Le canzoni del mondo di Oz
 2020 – Nomade digitale

References

External links
 
 Gianluca Testa at the Internet Movie Database
 Gianluca Testa on Movieplayer.it
 Gianluca Testa on Cinemaitaliano.info
 Gianluca Testa on Mymovies

1982 births
Living people
Italian male film actors